W. Franke Harling (January 18, 1887 – November 22, 1958) was a composer of film scores, operas, and popular music.

Life and career
Born William Franke Harling in London, he was educated at the Grace Choir Church School in New York City. After working as an organist and choir director at the Church of the Resurrection in Brussels, he spent two years at the United States Military Academy at West Point, and composed both its hymn, called "The Corps," and its official march, "West Point Forever."

In 1918, Harling contributed incidental music to the Broadway production of the 1898 play Pan and the Young Shepherd by Maurice Hewlett. In 1926, he collaborated with Laurence Stallings on Deep River, a voodoo-themed opera set in New Orleans in 1835. It opened on Broadway at the Imperial Theatre on October 4 and ran for 32 performances. 
  
Harling began his Hollywood career in 1928. His film credits include The Vagabond King, This Is the Night, So Big!, A Bill of Divorcement, Blonde Venus, A Farewell to Arms, The Bitter Tea of General Yen, Monte Carlo, Souls at Sea, and Penny Serenade.

Harling won the Academy Award for Best Music Scoring for Stagecoach (1939) and was nominated for Souls at Sea (1937) and Three Russian Girls (1944).

Harling's popular songs include "Beyond the Blue Horizon" (with Richard A. Whiting) popularized by Jeanette MacDonald in 1930 and Lou Christie thirty years later, and "Sing, You Sinners", originally performed by Lillian Roth in 1930 and a hit for Tony Bennett in 1950.

Harling won the Bispham Memorial Medal Award for his jazz-oriented opera A Light from St. Agnes.

Harling died in Sierra Madre, California and is buried in Forest Lawn Memorial Park in Hollywood Hills.

Selected filmography
 Every Woman Has Something (1931)
 Beauty and the Boss (1932)
 Penny Serenade (1941)

Selected songs
"Where was I", song by W. Franke Harling and Al Dubin performed by Ruby Newman and His Orchestra  with vocal chorus by  Larry Taylor and Peggy McCall  1939

References

External links

1887 births
1958 deaths
Best Original Music Score Academy Award winners
American film score composers
American male songwriters
American opera composers
Male opera composers
Musicians from London
Burials at Forest Lawn Memorial Park (Hollywood Hills)
English emigrants to the United States
American male classical composers
American classical composers
American male film score composers
20th-century classical composers
20th-century American composers
20th-century American male musicians